Ştiinţa Bacău may refer to:
 CS Știința Bacău - a men's football club founded in 1965 and dissolved in 1975
 FC Știința Bacău -a men's football club founded in 2008 and dissolved in 2009
 Știința Municipal Bacău - a men's handball club
 CS Știința Bacău - a women's handball club
 CS Știința Bacău - a women's volleyball club